Lim Yo-hwan, known by the ID SlayerS_`BoxeR` (usually shortened to BoxeR), is a former professional player of the real-time strategy computer game StarCraft. He is often referred to as The Terran Emperor, or simply "The Emperor", and is widely considered to be one of the most successful players of the genre as well as an esports icon. In late 2010, he retired from StarCraft: Brood War and founded the StarCraft II team SlayerS. Since the disbanding of SlayerS, he briefly returned to SK Telecom T1 (SK T1) as a coach before retiring due to health related issues. He is currently a professional poker player.

Lim has a record of 548 wins and 416 losses (56.80%) in his professional career.  He is one of the highest-paid professional gamers, with annual earnings that exceed US$400,000 and endorsement contracts that bring in an additional $90,000 per year.

Career 
Lim first came to fame by dominating professional StarCraft while choosing to use the Terran race. The following reign of dominance earned him the nickname the "Terran Emperor", a reference to StarCraft lore. During this early time in his career he innovated heavily, creating many new strategies that saw much use afterward, most notably making much more effective use of the Terran Dropship unit than had previously been achieved. He also gained a reputation for being able to turn around matches against the odds and having excellent micromanagement (unit control) skills. He would often continue the game despite heavy disadvantages yet still pull out a victory. In contrast, some commentators consider poor macromanagement (economy/unit production) skills his weakness, in comparison to other top-level professional StarCraft players.

BoxeR is most renowned for his creativity; often building proxy barracks. In many games, he has gone for quick attacks ("rushes") or special ops units ("ghosts") which make the games extremely entertaining. He is very well respected in StarCraft both in Korea and abroad.

In 2004 he was voted the greatest gamer of all time by readers of ESReality, a popular Western esports website, and in June 2006 he was included in an MTV list of "The 10 Most Influential Video Gamers Of All Time."

Even after his prime years, Lim was ranked 11th on the April 2006 Korean e-Sports Players Association (KeSPA) rankings, and made it to the finals of the EVER Ongamenet Starleague (OSL) of late 2004 (losing to iloveoov by three games to two) and the finals of the 2005 So1 OnGameNet Starleague (losing to Anytime by three games to two).

Lim had played professionally since version 1.07 of StarCraft, and managed to stay competitive by constantly changing his style, and has had a great influence of the development of modern playing styles, especially for Terran players. He is the all-time leader in games played and wins. He is a two time OSL champion, one time MSL champion, two time World Cyber Games (WCG) champion, and leader of the SK Telecom "T1" team. He is considered to have a strong eye for talent in that position, as he drew Choi Yeon-Sung (iloveoov), among others, from the amateur ranks. His team has consistently been the strongest in the Proleague.

In August 2006 Lim announced at the MSL group draws that he had received his draft letter from the government, and would be entering the Republic of Korea Air Force (ROKAF) by the end of the year. He later said he would try his best to return after his  years of service.

After joining the Air Force, Lim put his fame to work. After a month and a half an Air Force pro-gaming team was created. Lim found some retired pro-gamers who joined the Air Force before him, including H.O.T-Forever, CLon, ChRh, fOru, Rage, Qoo, Sunny and MuMyung. Together they formed the first military pro-gaming team. Two months after the team was announced, ACE (Airforce Challenge E-sports) was official. ACE first played in the 2008 ShinHan Proleague, and has participated ever since.

On December 22, 2008, Boxer returned to SKT1 and played on that team as military service was ending, and has remained on its A-Team; however, he has concentrated on playing individual league matches since then.

In September 2010, Boxer began playing high level StarCraft II games against other pro gamers as Terran under the username ManofOneway, but has switched to SlayerSBoxeR since he announced his return. He is now playing StarCraft II at a professional level and has made it to the Round of 4 in GSL (GOMTV Global StarCraft II League) Open Season 2, where he lost 0–4 to NesTea. However, he would not fare as well in following seasons, even dropping to Code A (the lower GSL League) in March 2011.

He formed the StarCraft II clan SlayerS (sls) in November 2010. As well, he is featured in a documentary TV show, 'Boxer's Wings, about his StarCraft career and his transition from StarCraft: Brood War to StarCraft II.

In March 2011, SlayerSBoxer's newly formed "SlayerS Clan" StarCraft II team won the GOMTV Global StarCraft II Team League, just months after their formation, defeating teams Startale, and oGs (Old Generations). They would go on to defeat IM (Incredible Miracle) by 5 games to 4 in a best-of-9 series. The same month SlayerSBoxer was also one of the few Koreans drafted for the North American Star League, a new tournament outside of the Korean StarCraft scene, with a prize pool of $100,000. "SlayerS Clan" repeated the feat by winning the next GOMTV Global StarCraft II Team League in May 2011, beating the team "MVP" in the final and proving to be a very consistent team.

SlayerSBoxeR returned to the most prestigious Code S tournament on December 22, 2011, for the GSL January 2012 tournament.

It was announced on January 25, 2012, that SlayerSBoxeR would be appointed the head playing coach for the team SlayerS. This would be the first time he would be part of the coaching staff for any team in his 13-year-long career.

On April 16, 2012, it was announced that BoxeR would be forfeiting his Code A match due to health concerns. His shoulder has been hurting for over a year and prevented him from playing more than five games a day. As a result, he has decided to take a break from progaming to rehabilitate, assuring that his break is only temporary.

On August 16, 2012, it was announced that BoxeR would be leaving SlayerS and re-joining SKT1 as a StarCraft II team coach. On September 26, 2013, Lim left this positions due to health complications and effectively retired from the eSports scene.

Lim announced his career switch to a professional poker player in February 2014.

BoxeR played in an exhibition "Archon Mode" StarCraft tournament hosted by Blizzard on November 6, 2015, at Blizzcon 2015 .

Poker career 
After retiring from the Starcraft scene, Lim Yo-hwan transitioned to poker, claiming that it is less demanding from a physiological standpoint. He plays both online and live since 2014. As of 2018, he has collected nearly $200,000 in live earnings on the Asian Poker Circuit. He plays mostly in Macau, Manila, and Las Vegas, but was also seen in Vietnam.

He entered competitions such as the APT, APL, and Macau Poker Cup on several occasions.

His biggest cash live was $33,100 when he finished 2nd at the APT - Asian Poker Series Experience Manila in 2016.

Personal life 
Lim wrote an autobiography entitled Crazy as Me in 2004 detailing his life as a pro gamer.

In 2011 Lim Yo-hwan entered a common-law marriage with South Korean actress and media personality Kim Ga-yeon, also known as SlayerS`Jessica, who is eight years older than him. The marriage was kept secret for two years. They welcomed a baby girl on August 1, 2015. The couple was later formally married on May 8, 2016 after 5 years of common-law marriage.

Promotions 
In addition to team sponsors with SKT1 and SlayerS, BoxeR has been personally sponsored by companies including LG and Intel.  In 2011, after becoming an Intel spokesman, he guest-starred in the Visual Life commercial series starring Girls' Generation (SNSD) that featured him playing TvZ (Terran Vs. Zerg) against Im Yoona at the top-floor cafeteria of the SM Entertainment office in Chungdamdong to promote the gaming-related capability of Intel computers. It was confirmed that the two exchanged autographs, including Yoona signing BoxeR's keyboard. The commercial was pulled from Korean TV when Intel execs realized that their gameplay footage was a replay of one of BoxeR's earlier televised matches.

Lim currently holds a position as a public promotional director at a Korean mobile game company Me2on, the company that sponsors Lim's professional poker player career.

Tournament results 
 Semi-Finalist (4th place) in StarCraft II GSL Season 2 2010
 Two times World Cyber Games champion (2001, 2002 as gonia119_kr)
 Won the first KPGA Tour (now MBC starleague)
 Has finished 2nd in Ongamenet Starleague 4 times (2001 SKY, 2002 SKY, 2004 EVER, 2005 SO1)
 Finished 2nd in the first KT-KTF Premiere league
 KPGA MBC Starleague Champion February 2002 to March 2002

Distinctions
 Leader of SlayerS Clan, the championship team of GSTL March and GSTL May 2011
 Signed with "Team Razer" February 14, 2011
 Earned an income of over $US 300,000 (annual)
 Longest time to hold first place in Korean e-Sports Players Association (KeSPA) rankings (17 months)
 First player to win more than one OSL (Hanbitsoft 2001, Coca-Cola 2001), and the first to win two consecutive OSLs
 First player to make the OSL finals three times in a row
 First player to achieve 100 wins in Ongamenet Starleagues (OSL)
 Most wins on televised matches (500)

Filmography

Web shows

See also 
StarCraft professional competition

References 

South Korean esports players
South Korean Roman Catholics
StarCraft players
Living people
1980 births
T1 (esports) players
Team Razer players
Air Force ACE players
StarCraft coaches